Lyubimetz 13  is a comedy movie released in Bulgaria in 1958. It was directed by Vladimir Yanchev and written by Lyuben Popov and Vladimir Yanchev. The film tells an amusing story about the efforts of three soccer clubs to attract the player of the day. But when the player’s twin brother - a hopeless gambler - decides to take the initiative... And to put the thin lid on it all, a pretty girl stays in the middle...

Plot 

They are two brothers… and they are twins. Radoslav is a young and talented soccer player, playing in a team from Varna, while Radosvet is an impossible gambler, chased by the police. Radoslav meets the beautiful Elena on the beach and they fall in love. However, she is from Sofia and soon takes the train home. After a bit of confusion, instead of the address of Elena, Radoslav gets a completely useless piece of paper. Elena seems like a lost dream but he is soon determined to go to Sofia, walk along the streets and find her.

In the meantime, three soccer teams, one of which from Sofia, decide to bid for Radoslav and send agents to Varna to negotiate with him. As  Radoslav is already in Sofia, the negotiators encounter Radosvet. Of course, our gambler decides to take the best out of the situation and, pretending to be Radoslav, signs a contract with the club from Sofia.

Now both brothers are in Sofia. Radoslav keeps on searching for his Elena without the slightest suspicion of his brother’s intrigues. But Radosvet is the one hitting the jackpot, meeting Elena. However, his behavior is unbearably impudent; she slaps his face and does not want to see him anymore. Clearly, she does not suspect that this is not Radoslav. A few moments later, when by the will of fortune, she finally meets the true Radoslav, all her anger is transferred over him. He manages to clarify the situation and they both go to see the first game of Radosvet, who plays with number 13. Of course, the team of Radosvet is defeated, after a myriad of comic situations. It becomes clear to everyone that both brothers have switched places. Radoslav gets the offer to go to play in Sofia, but he declines it and with Elena leaves for Varna.

Cast 
 Apostol Karamitev - Radoslav and Radosvet
 Ginka Stancheva - Elena
 Lyubomir Bobchevski - The Old Man
 Elena Hranova - Granny Tinka
 Pencho Petrov - Strogov
 Georgi Radanov - Valyo Valchanov
 Nadezhda Vakavchieva - Mammy Nevyana
 Georgi Karev - Gogo
 Petko Karlukovsky - Petzi
 Magda Kolchakova - Pena
 Encho Bagarov - Rasho Chukov
 Georgi Partsalev - Gocho Polyanski
 Lyubomir Bodurov - The Tenor
 Leo Konforti
 Georgi Kaloyanchev

Special notes 
 Boyana Film is often credited for making the Bulgarian films after 1950. However, the studio was officially established in 1962, accommodating the previously available facilities.

External links 
 

1958 films
1958 comedy films
Bulgarian comedy films
Bulgarian-language films